Rodolfo Alejandro Madrid González (born 14 May 1980), is a Chilean former footballer and current manager of Rodelindo Román.

He has coached Club Rodelindo Román since 2018.

Honours

As player

Club
Deportes Temuco
 Primera B (1): 2001

Colo-Colo
 Primera División (1): 2002 Clausura

References

External links
 Rodolfo Madrid at Football-Lineups
 
 

1980 births
Living people
People from Cachapoal Province
People from O'Higgins Region
Chilean footballers
Colo-Colo footballers
C.D. Antofagasta footballers
Deportes Temuco footballers
C.D. Huachipato footballers
Club Deportivo Palestino footballers
Unión Española footballers
Primera B de Chile players
Chilean Primera División players
Association football midfielders
Chilean football managers